Arkadi Nemirovski (born March 14, 1947) is a professor at the H. Milton Stewart School of Industrial and Systems Engineering at the Georgia Institute of Technology.  He has been a leader in continuous optimization and is best known for his work on the ellipsoid method, modern interior-point methods and robust optimization.

Biography
Nemirovski earned a Ph.D. in Mathematics in 1974 from Moscow State University and a Doctor of Sciences in Mathematics degree in 1990 from the Institute of Cybernetics of the Ukrainian Academy of Sciences in Kiev. He has won three prestigious prizes: the Fulkerson Prize, the George B. Dantzig Prize, and the John von Neumann Theory Prize.
He was elected a member of the U.S. National Academy of Engineering (NAE) in 2017 "for the development of efficient algorithms for large-scale convex optimization problems", and the U.S National Academy of Sciences (NAS) in 2020.

Academic work
Nemirovski first proposed mirror descent along with David Yudin in 1983.

His work with Yurii Nesterov in their 1994 book is the first to point out that the interior point method can solve convex optimization problems, and the first to make a systematic study of semidefinite programming (SDP). Also in this book, they introduced the self-concordant functions which are useful in the analysis of Newton's method.

Books
 co-authored with Yurii Nesterov: 
 co-authored with Aharon Ben-Tal: 
 co-authored with A. Ben-Tal and L. El Ghaoui:

References

External links 
 Arkadi Nemirovski, Ph.D. – ISyE
 Arkadi Nemirovski's website
 Arkadi Nemirovski – Technion
 https://web.archive.org/web/20160513155431/https://www.informs.org/Recognize-Excellence/INFORMS-Prizes-Awards/John-von-Neumann-Theory-Prize

1947 births
Living people
20th-century American mathematicians
21st-century American mathematicians
Russian mathematicians
Jewish American scientists
Israeli mathematicians
Ukrainian mathematicians
John von Neumann Theory Prize winners
Georgia Tech faculty
Members of the United States National Academy of Sciences
21st-century American Jews